Hinuera is a settlement in the Waikato Region of New Zealand's North Island. It is located along State Highway 29, approximately halfway between the cities of Hamilton and Tauranga. It also contains the Hinuera cliffs along State Highway 29.

Hinuera had a butter factory from 1922 to 1987. Electric street lights were introduced in 1923.

Geography

Hinuera Stone, or Ongatiti Ignimbrite, is a Late Pleistocene, light-brown rock containing angular fragments of pumice in a fine-grained ash matrix. It has been quarried since at least 1893, though not on the present scale until 1954, and is sold as Hinuera Stone for cladding and other decorative uses. The stone is soft enough to be quarried by cutting with saws. One of the first houses built with Hinuera stone was the Bishop's House in Ponsonby in 1893.

The Hinuera Gap, a geological feature stretching west and southwest from the locality towards Piarere, was in prehistoric times the path of the Waikato River, which had its outlet in the Firth of Thames. The river's course was altered to its current outflow by the massive Oruanui eruption about 26,500 years ago. A remnant river, the Waitoa River, now flows through the gap, with its source lying less than one kilometre from the Waikato River, close to the junctions of SH1 and SH29. The route of the latter of these roads takes it through the Hinuera Gap.

Demographics 
The SA1 area is part of the larger Hinuera statistical area.

The SA1 area had a population of 162 at the 2018 New Zealand census, an increase of 9 people (5.9%) since the 2013 census, and an increase of 12 people (8.0%) since the 2006 census. There were 63 households, comprising 87 males and 75 females, giving a sex ratio of 1.16 males per female. The median age was 36.7 years (compared with 37.4 years nationally), with 39 people (24.1%) aged under 15 years, 33 (20.4%) aged 15 to 29, 75 (46.3%) aged 30 to 64, and 21 (13.0%) aged 65 or older.

Ethnicities were 87.0% European/Pākehā, 11.1% Māori, 1.9% Pacific peoples, 3.7% Asian, and 3.7% other ethnicities. People may identify with more than one ethnicity.

Although some people chose not to answer the census's question about religious affiliation, 48.1% had no religion, and 33.3% were Christian.

Of those at least 15 years old, 15 (12.2%) people had a bachelor's or higher degree, and 30 (24.4%) people had no formal qualifications. The median income was $40,900, compared with $31,800 nationally. 27 people (22.0%) earned over $70,000 compared to 17.2% nationally. The employment status of those at least 15 was that 81 (65.9%) people were employed full-time, 18 (14.6%) were part-time, and 3 (2.4%) were unemployed.

Hinuera statistical area

Hinuera had a population of 1,152 at the 2018 New Zealand census, an increase of 48 people (4.3%) since the 2013 census, and an increase of 42 people (3.8%) since the 2006 census. There were 423 households, comprising 582 males and 570 females, giving a sex ratio of 1.02 males per female. The median age was 39.4 years (compared with 37.4 years nationally), with 237 people (20.6%) aged under 15 years, 216 (18.8%) aged 15 to 29, 525 (45.6%) aged 30 to 64, and 174 (15.1%) aged 65 or older.

Ethnicities were 91.7% European/Pākehā, 9.9% Māori, 0.8% Pacific peoples, 3.6% Asian, and 1.8% other ethnicities. People may identify with more than one ethnicity.

The percentage of people born overseas was 14.6, compared with 27.1% nationally.

Although some people chose not to answer the census's question about religious affiliation, 51.0% had no religion, 37.5% were Christian, 0.5% had Māori religious beliefs, 0.5% were Hindu, 0.5% were Muslim, 0.8% were Buddhist and 1.0% had other religions.

Of those at least 15 years old, 132 (14.4%) people had a bachelor's or higher degree, and 186 (20.3%) people had no formal qualifications. The median income was $43,300, compared with $31,800 nationally. 210 people (23.0%) earned over $70,000 compared to 17.2% nationally. The employment status of those at least 15 was that 567 (62.0%) people were employed full-time, 168 (18.4%) were part-time, and 15 (1.6%) were unemployed.

Railway station 
Hinuera was a flag station off Hinuera Rd, on the Kinleith Branch, from 8 March 1886. It was 78 m (256 ft) above sea level. The station was renamed from Mangawhara to Hinuera on 1 April 1897, as the Post Office found that Mangawhara was confused with Mangawhare, near Dargaville. Hinuera was used as a transfer point during construction of Horahora power station in 1911, for additional turbines in the 1920s. The station became staffed and expanded to 3 tracks in 1919, when part of the plantation was removed. Like many stations in this area, Hinuera was protected by a tree plantation, part of which remains, though more of it, on the east side, was felled between 1943 and 1966. The station closed to passengers on 12 November 1968 and to freight on 29 March 1981. Only the plantation and passing loop remain.

Education

The area's first official school, Mangawhara School, opened in 1908, though the Education Board had a lease of a railway cottage from 1893.

Notable people

 James Cotter, MLC was from Hinuera

References

External links 

 2014 view of old butter factory

Populated places in Waikato
Matamata-Piako District